Exaeretodon is an extinct genus of fairly large, low-slung traversodontid cynodonts from the southern parts of Pangea. Four species are known, from various formations. E. argentinus is from the Carnian-age (Late Triassic) Cancha de Bochas Member of the Ischigualasto Formation in the Ischigualasto-Villa Unión Basin in northwestern Argentina. E. major and E. riograndensis are from the Carnian-age portion of the Santa Maria Formation of the Paraná Basin in southeastern Brazil. E. statisticae is from the Carnian-age Lower Maleri Formation of India.

Description 
 

An analysis of the size of the bones of calves collected in Paleorrota concluded that the mother Exaeretodon had one or two calves, for one pregnancy.

Taxonomy 
When he first named the species, Argentine paleontologist José Bonaparte mentioned several features that distinguish it from all other traversodontids. The tooth rows of the upper jaw are more parallel to each other in Ischignathus sudamericanus than they are in Exaeretodon, and they are also inset closer to the inside of the mouth. There are also more postcanine teeth oriented toward middle of the subtemporal fenestrae (two holes in the bottom of the skull) and ascending rama of the dentary (projections of the lower jaw that extend up to the skull). The ascending rama are also wider and taller in the I. sudamericanus specimen. The orbit or eye socket is longer than that of Exaeretodon, as are the palatine bones.

Despite the differences, a 2007 study concluded that the I. sudamericanus skull represents the same species as E. argentinus. Using allometry, paleontologist Jun Liu found I. sudamericanus to be the largest known example of a growth series in E. argentinus. Thus, Ischignathus is now regarded as a junior synonym of Exaeretodon. As the animal grew, the proportions of bones changed. These differing proportions were initially seen as species-distinguishing characters, but are now regarded as natural ontogenic variation.

See also 
 
 Ischigualasto Formation

References 

Traversodontids
Prehistoric cynodont genera
Ladinian first appearances
Carnian extinctions
Triassic synapsids of Asia
Fossils of India
Late Triassic synapsids of South America
Triassic Argentina
Fossils of Argentina
Ischigualasto Formation
Triassic Brazil
Fossils of Brazil
Santa Maria Formation
Fossil taxa described in 1943
Taxa named by Ángel Cabrera